Karasiński (feminine: Karasińska) is a Polish surname.  Notable people with the name include:

 Jerzy Karasiński (1942–2015), Polish footballer
 Katarzyna Karasińska (born 1982), Polish alpine skier
 Piotr Karasinski, Polish-American quantitative analyst
 Tomasz Karasiński (born 1973), Polish footballer

Other
 Black–Karasinski model, financial mathematical model of the term structure of interest rates

See also
Krasiński

Polish-language surnames